Bennett Lawson is an American politician from Chicago. He is the alderperson-elect for Chicago City Council's 44th ward, and will take office on May 13, 2023. He won the 2023 election for the seat uncontested, replacing retiring alderman Tom Tunney. He previously served as Tunney's chief of staff.

References 

Chicago City Council members